Saint Bee may refer to:
 Saint Begga (615–693), daughter of Pepin of Landen, mayor of the palace of Austrasia
 Saint Bega, Dark Ages saint of what is now north-west England